Indonesian R&B singer Agnes Monica has released five studio albums, one greatest hits album, and five compilation albums. Agnes signed a recording contract with MM Records in 1994 and released her debut children studio album Si Meong. Unfortunately, her album was unsuccessfully into market. In 1995, she moved signed a recording contract with Musica Studios and released her duet album and also her second children studio album Yess! which released her self-titled single was successfully into market. She released her third children studio album Bala-Bala (1998) with Viva Music/Paragon Record. The album is her last album as child singer.

Agnes signed a record deal with Indonesian second biggest record label Aquarius Musikindo and first released under the label was her debut studio album And the Story Goes (2003), which her extension as child singer to adult singer. The single "Bukan Milikmu Lagi" reached number one as Highest Debut and reached four weeks as Longest Stay in the MTV Ampuh. The album has sold more than 300.000 copies and certified double platinum album in the Indonesia. Followed by debut album, she released her second studio album Whaddup A.. '?! (2005), which Agnes' readiness for "go international" realized through collaboration with American singer-songwriter Keith Martin. The album was certified triple platinum album for album sales figures which reached more than 450.000 copies. Agnes' third studio album Sacredly Agnezious (2009) featured the single "Matahariku", whose ring back tone sales reached more than three million within nine months. The music video has also been watched more than 4.5 million times on YouTube, become the most watched music videos.  Agnes released her first greatest hits album Agnes Is My Name (2011) and produced two singles "Karena Ku Sanggup" and "Paralyzed". The album was cooperated with recording company and American fastfood KFC and will released in the KFC store throughout Indonesia. The greatest hits album was estimated sales figures for 1.000.000 copies and certified multi-platinum album, same like her 2009 studio album.

Since name of Agnes Monica changed to Agnez Mo, her first-English language album Agnez Mo was released on 1 June 2013 under a record label Entertainment Inc. The self-titled album only secured a deal with Indomaret and Kopi Kapal Api to release the demo tracks to the Indonesian market only. First single "Walk" was released on same date with brand name SimPati and also peaked at number one in the Rolling Stone Indonesia. The single also used as soundtrack for simPATI. On 30 June 2013, Agnes introduced the first international single "Coke Bottle" at the Palace Hotel, San Francisco with American rapper Timbaland and released as a digital single on 8 April 2014 by The Cherry Party, which is owned by Sony Music Entertainment. The single was failed commercial and couldn't penetrate Billboard charts.

In late 2015, Agnes released Extended Plays for  "Boy Magnet", with five remixes by DJ Hector Fonseca, Tommy Love, Xavi Alvaro and John Dish.

In late 2016, Agnes released her Indonesian song Sebuah Rasa which peaked at number 1 on iTunes Chart Indonesia.
On 10 October 2017 she released her International debut Album called X produced by Danja
In July 2018 Agnez was released her Collaboration with American Singer Chris Brown.

Albums

Studio albums

Greatest hits albums

Compilation albums

Singles

As lead artist

As featured artist

Music Video

References

Discographies of Indonesian artists
Pop music discographies
Contemporary R&B discographies